Sphingomonas koreensis  is a Gram-negative and aerobic bacteria from the genus of Sphingomonas which has been isolated from natural mineral water in Taejon in Korea. In one patient, with a meningeal drain,  Sphingomonas koreensis was reported to cause meningitis.

References

Further reading 
 <

External links
Type strain of Sphingomonas koreensis at BacDive -  the Bacterial Diversity Metadatabase

koreensis
Bacteria described in 2001